Liberty Bartlett (born 1810) was a circuit judge in Arkansas.

Bartlett was born in 1810 in Williamstown, Massachusetts. He lived in California for a time, and later moved to Arkansas. He became a circuit judge of the fifth circuit in Little Rock on November 12, 1854.

Judge Bartlett attempted to establish a settlement in 1872, at the present site of Marche, Arkansas. The settlement, which would have been named Bartlett Springs, did not succeed, and the Little Rock and Fort Smith Railroad ended up acquiring the property and naming it Warren Station. It was later named Marche, and settled by Polish immigrants.

Bartlett was reported to have lived to "extreme old age."

References

1810 births
Date of death unknown
People from Arkansas
People from Williamstown, Massachusetts
Circuit court judges in the United States
Year of death missing